Kargah (also Romanized as Kārgāh) is a village in Sahray-ye Bagh Rural District, Sahray-ye Bagh District, Larestan County, Fars Province, Iran. At the 2006 census, its population was 763, in 158 families.

References 

Populated places in Larestan County